František Pala and Balázs Taróczy were the defending champions, but lost in the first round this year.

Ion Ţiriac and Guillermo Vilas won the title, defeating Jürgen Fassbender and Tom Okker 3–6, 6–4, 7–6 in the final.

Seeds

  Bob Hewitt /  Karl Meiler (semifinals)
  Jürgen Fassbender /  Tom Okker (final)
  François Jauffret /  Antonio Muñoz (quarterfinals)
  Ion Ţiriac /  Guillermo Vilas (champions)

Draw

Draw

External links
 Draw

1978 Grand Prix (tennis)
1978 BMW Open